Tum Mile (transl. I met you) is a 2009 Indian Hindi-language romantic disaster film directed by Kunal Deshmukh, with story concept by Vishesh Bhatt. The film stars Emraan Hashmi and Soha Ali Khan in lead roles. It is a love story set against the backdrop of the infamous July 2005 Mumbai floods. The film was released on 13 November 2009.

Plot 
The movie is in clips of Past and Present. Akshay Malvade who is an artist and a character designer in present departures on a flight. He is boarding from London. Suddenly he sees Sanjana Singhania who is sitting just opposite Akshay, and next to business man number 23. They both see each other. Akshay and Sanjana remember a series of flashbacks. Akshay was a struggling artist who was in Cape Town. He sees Sanjana first time at that point. Then while Sanjana tries to take out her car she accidentally bumps Akshay's car and leaves a note on it. Akshay and his friend Vicky go to her house and while coming back they have a lot of fun. The next day Akshay and Sanjana go to a party and kiss. They discover their love. Sanjana breaks up with her fiancé and confesses her feelings to Akshay. Akshay and Sanjana settle down. As Akshay is an artist and not employed his business is not improving. He also has an ego fight with a distributor. As Akshay doesn't have any money he gets frustrated and takes it out on Sanjana. Sanjana has been working for quite a while. After some time Akshay gets a job in Sydney. As Sanjana can not leave her job and Akshay is interested in the offer they have a fight and break up. Back in the present when they remember these memories the situation is worst in Mumbai. The heavy rains have flooded the city (Indicating the Maharashtra floods of 2005). Many are trying to survive. While their adventure for survival continues Vicky is electrocuted as he falls in water with a cable carrying an electric current. After spending time together they realise that their break-up 6 years back was just a break for them as their destiny is to be united.

Cast 
Emraan Hashmi as Akshay "Akki" Malvade
Soha Ali Khan as Sanjana Singhania
VJ Mantra as Vicky Kapoor
Sachin Khedekar as Mr. Amar Singhania
Rituraj Singh as Mr. Vishal Oberoi
 Emilie Bachet as mystery traveller, Karen Jones
Simon Burns as business man number 2
 Atul Srivastava as Electrician in Cape Town

Critical reception 
Tum Mile opened to mixed to positive reviews, with most major critics agreeing it to be a passable movie. Taran Adarsh of Bollywood Hungama gave it a rating of 3/5 and said, "Tum Mile caters to the youth mainly. At the box-office, the Vishesh Films - Emraan Hashmi combo has cultivated a strong fan-base over the years and coupled with good music, which is also very popular, the film should find itself in the comfortable zone".
Filmicafe - Review 
Bollywood Hungama - Review

Box office 
According to Box Office India, Tum Mile was a flop, grossing only 13.46 crores on a budget of 22 crore, just short of its budget.

Soundtrack

The soundtrack was released on 16 September. The songs were composed by Pritam with lyrics by Sayeed Quadri and Kumaar.

The film score was composed by Raju Singh.

Track list

References

External links 
 
 Tum Mile at Bollywood Hungama

Films set in Mumbai
2009 films
2000s disaster films
Indian disaster films
Disaster films based on actual events
2000s Hindi-language films
Films featuring songs by Pritam